Conor Harte (born 3 April 1988) is an Ireland men's field hockey international. He played for Ireland at both the 2016 Summer Olympics and the 2018 Men's Hockey World Cup. He was also a member of the Ireland team that won the bronze medal at the 2015 Men's EuroHockey Championship. Harte has won national league titles in Ireland and has played in the Hockey India League. Harte's twin brother, David, and his sister, Emer, are also Ireland field hockey internationals. The Harte brothers have lined out together with eight different field hockey teams – Bandon Grammar School, Cork Harlequins, Pembroke Wanderers, DCU, SCHC, Dabang Mumbai, Munster and Ireland.

Early years, family and education
Harte was raised in Ballinspittle, near Kinsale, West Cork. His mother was from Ballyheigue, County Kerry where his grandfather won county hurling medals. His father, Kieran Harte is a member of the prominent Tyrone GAA family. He was a goalkeeper for Tyrone in the 1972 Ulster Senior Football Championship final. Kieran's teammates on the day included his first cousin, Mickey Harte. Consequently, Conor Harte is also a cousin of Michaela McAreavey, Mark Harte, Peter Harte and the Gaelic footballer, David Harte. Harte's twin brother, David, is also an Ireland men's field hockey international and his sister, Emer is an Ireland women's field hockey international. In his youth Harte played gaelic games with Courcey Rovers. Harte was educated at Bandon Grammar School. Between 2006 and 2009 he attended Dublin City University where he gained a BA in accounting and finance. In 2014 he gained a Diploma of Education from Trinity College Dublin. In 2018 he began studying for a PhD at Cork Institute of Technology.

Domestic teams

Bandon Grammar School
Harte began playing field hockey at the age of thirteen at Bandon Grammar School. In 2005 Conor and David helped Bandon win the All Ireland Schoolboys Hockey Championship.

Cork Harlequins
While studying for their Leaving Cert at Bandon Grammar School, Conor and David, also played for Cork Harlequins, helping them win the 2006 Irish Senior Cup.

Pembroke Wanderers
While studying at Dublin City University, Harte also began playing for Pembroke Wanderers. In 2008–09, together with his brother David, Ronan Gormley, Stuart Loughrey, Justin Sheriff, Craig Fulton and Alan Sothern, Harte was a member of the Pembroke Wanderers team that won the Irish Senior Cup, the Men's Irish Hockey League and the EuroHockey Club Trophy. While playing for Wanderers, the Harte brothers also represented DCU at intervarsity level.

SCHC
In 2010 Harte began playing for SCHC. His brother, David, also played for SCHC.

Racing Club de Bruxelles
Since 2014 Harte has played for Racing Club de Bruxelles in the Men's Belgian Hockey League. He also played for Racing in the 2017–18 Euro Hockey League. His teammates at Racing have included Alan Sothern.

Dabang Mumbai
Harte played for Dabang Mumbai in the 2015 Hockey India League season, once again teaming up with his brother David. In the players' auction he was drafted for $10,000.

Dragons
After seven years at Racing he joined Dragons in the summer of 2021.

Ireland international
Harte made his senior debut for Ireland in August 2006 in a Celtic Cup game against France. Harte's  brother, David, and his sister, Emer, also made their senior international debuts on the same day. Harte was a member of the Ireland teams that won the 2009 Men's EuroHockey Nations Trophy and the 2011 Men's Hockey Champions Challenge II. He also helped Ireland win Men's FIH Hockey World League tournaments in 2012, 2015 and 2017. On 1 June 2017, Harte made his 200th senior appearance for Ireland in a 2–2 with Pakistan. He marked the occasion by scoring from a penalty corner. Harte was also a member of the Ireland team that won the bronze medal at the 2015 Men's EuroHockey Nations Championship. He represented Ireland at the 2016 Summer Olympics and at the 2018 Men's Hockey World Cup.

Honours
Ireland
Men's FIH Hockey World League Round 1
Winners: 2012 Cardiff
Men's FIH Hockey World League Round 2
Winners: 2015 San Diego, 2017 Belfast
Runners up: 2013 New Delhi
Men's FIH Series Finals
Runners up: 2019 Le Touquet
Men's Hockey Champions Challenge II
Winners: 2011
Runners up: 2009
Men's EuroHockey Nations Trophy
Winners: 2009
Men's Field Hockey Olympic Qualifier
Runners up: 2012
Men's Hockey Investec Cup
Runners up: 2014
Pembroke Wanderers
EuroHockey Club Trophy
Winners: 2009: 1 
Men's Irish Hockey League
Winners: 2008–09
Irish Senior Cup
Winners: 2008, 2009: 2
Cork Harlequins
Irish Senior Cup
Winners: 2006: 1
Bandon Grammar School
All Ireland Schoolboys Hockey Championship
Winners: 2005: 1

References

1988 births
Living people
Irish male field hockey players
Male field hockey defenders
Olympic field hockey players of Ireland
Field hockey players at the 2016 Summer Olympics
2018 Men's Hockey World Cup players
Pembroke Wanderers Hockey Club players
SCHC players
Hockey India League players
Twin sportspeople
Sportspeople from County Cork
Expatriate field hockey players
Irish expatriate sportspeople in Belgium
Irish expatriate sportspeople in India
People educated at Bandon Grammar School
Alumni of Dublin City University
Alumni of Trinity College Dublin
Alumni of Cork Institute of Technology
Irish expatriate sportspeople in the Netherlands
Men's Irish Hockey League players
Ireland international men's field hockey players
Men's Hoofdklasse Hockey players
Irish twins
Men's Belgian Hockey League players
Conor
Royal Racing Club Bruxelles players
KHC Dragons players